Below is a list of American films released in 1944. Going My Way won Best Picture at the 17th Academy Awards. The remaining four nominees were Double Indemnity, Gaslight, Since You Went Away and Wilson.

A

B

C

D

E-F

G-H

I-J

K-L

M-N

O-R

S

T

U-Z

Documentaries

Serials

Shorts

See also
 1944 in the United States

References

External links

1944 films at the Internet Movie Database

1944
Films
Lists of 1944 films by country or language